Chris Boucher may refer to:

Chris Boucher (basketball) (born 1993), Saint Lucian-born Canadian basketball player
Chris Boucher (writer) (1943–2022), British writer